Marquess Lie may refer to:

Marquess Lie of Zhao (died 400 BC)
Marquess Lie of Han (died 387 BC)